The Bedminster Township School District is a community public school district that serves students in pre-kindergarten through eighth grade from Bedminster, in Somerset County, New Jersey, United States.

As of the 2020–21 school year, the district, comprised of one school, had an enrollment of 486 students and 54.9 classroom teachers (on an FTE basis), for a student–teacher ratio of 8.9:1.

The district is classified by the New Jersey Department of Education as being in District Factor Group "I", the second-highest of eight groupings. District Factor Groups organize districts statewide to allow comparison by common socioeconomic characteristics of the local districts. From lowest socioeconomic status to highest, the categories are A, B, CD, DE, FG, GH, I and J.

Public school students in ninth through twelfth grades attend Bernards High School, as part of a sending/receiving relationship with the Somerset Hills Regional School District, a K - 12 district that also serves students from Bernardsville, Far Hills and Peapack-Gladstone. As of the 2020–21 school year, the high school had an enrollment of 819 students and 66.3 classroom teachers (on an FTE basis), for a student–teacher ratio of 12.4:1.

School
Bedminster Township Public School had an enrollment of 483 students in grades PreK to 8 in the 2020–21 school year. 
Corby Swan, Principal (PreK to 4th Grade)
Dr. Elizabeth Omegna, Principal (5th Grade to 8th Grade)

Bedminster Township Public School offers a variety of competitive sports.

Administration
Core members of the district's administration are:
Jennifer Giordano, Superintendent
Eulalia Gillis, Interim Business Administrator / Board Secretary

Board of education
The district's board of education is comprised of nine members who set policy and oversee the fiscal and educational operation of the district through its administration. As a Type II school district, the board's trustees are elected directly by voters to serve three-year terms of office on a staggered basis, with three seats up for election each year held (since 2012) as part of the November general election. The board appoints a superintendent to oversee the district's day-to-day operations and a business administrator to supervise the business functions of the district.

References

External links
Bedminster Township Public School
 
School Data for the Bedminster Township Public School, National Center for Education Statistics

Bedminster, New Jersey
New Jersey District Factor Group I
School districts in Somerset County, New Jersey
Public K–8 schools in New Jersey